Bolhás is a village in Somogy county, Hungary.

Etymology
Its name derives from the Hungarian word bolha. According to the legends the village belonged to a knight who was called Bolha.

Culture
The Hungarian folk songs Megismerni a kanászt and Volt nekem egy kecském were collected in 1922 in Bolhás by Zoltán Kodály.

External links 
 Street map (Hungarian)

References 

Populated places in Somogy County